The Undivided Five is the third studio album by the ambient music duo A Winged Victory for the Sullen. It was released on 1 November 2019 on Ninja Tune.

Recording
The Undivided Five was produced in eight different recording studios across Europe. A Winged Victory for the Sullens two members, Dustin O'Halloran and Adam Wiltzie, recorded in their own respective studios in Berlin, Germany and Brussels, Belgium. Orchestral samples were recorded at Studio 22 at Magyar Rádió, Hungary's official international broadcasting station, in Budapest and several parts of the album were rerecorded in Église du Béguinage in Brussels. O'Halloran and Wiltzie recorded additional grand piano at a woodland studio in northern Italy and "experimented with overdubs" at Australian composer Ben Frosts studio in Reykjavík, Iceland. The final mix was conducted at Vox Ton in Berlin, where all previous A Winged Victory for the Sullen releases had been mixed.

Composition
The Undivided Five features 9 tracks, consisting of a mixture of strings, piano and modular synthesizers. In particular, O'Halloran and Wiltzie were influenced by French impressionist composer Claude Debussy, "whose big chords and complicated arrangements inform a lot of their approach" and who the opening track ("Our Lord Debussy") alludes to. Icelandic composer Jóhann Jóhannsson, for whom the duo had completed a remix prior to his death in 2018, was also noted as an influence.

One of O'Halloran and Wiltzie's closest friends died at the beginning of The Undivided Fives recording sessions, at which point O'Halloran also learned he was to become a father for the first time. The album's theme was described as "a profound realisation of life, death, the afterlife, and the spaces in between". Swedish abstract artist Hilma af Klints spiritist group "The Five" subsequently informed the album's themes and inspired the title. The title is also a reference to the album's songs being "centered around the harmonic perfect fifth", "the five senses" and "the divine interval".

Release
The Undivided Five was released on 1 November 2019 on Ninja Tune. It is A Winged Victory for the Sullen's debut release on the label; the duo were previously signed to Erased Tapes Records in Europe and Kranky in North America. The album will be issued on CD, standard and deluxe-edition 180-gram LP and made available for digital download and streaming. A double A-side digital-only single, "The Rhythm of a Dividing Pair"/"The Haunted Victorian Pencil" was released as The Undivided Fives lead single on 24 September, the day of the album's announcement.

Track listing

Charts

Release history

References

2019 albums
A Winged Victory for the Sullen albums
Ninja Tune albums